Fuad Almuqtadir is a Bangladeshi-American music Record Producer, Composer, Musician and Singer-Songwriter. Fuad's style of music incorporates with fusion, folk, rock, pop and electronic dance music.

References

External links
 
 
 
 

1980 births
Living people
Bangladeshi composers
21st-century Bangladeshi male singers
21st-century Bangladeshi singers
Bangladeshi guitarists
People from Sylhet Division
21st-century guitarists
Bangladeshi emigrants to the United States
G-Series (record label) artists